Clydagnathus is a genus of conodonts in the family Cavusgnathidae. Species are known from the Carboniferous of India and the Devonian of Morocco.

References

External links 
 

Ozarkodinida genera
Devonian conodonts
Mississippian conodonts
Fossil taxa described in 1969